Jaicko Lawrence is a Bajan contemporary pop music singer-songwriter signed to Capitol Records. Born Jaicko Lawrence on 6 August 1991 in Christ Church, Barbados, Jaicko has been nominated for six Barbados Music Awards, including Best Pop Single, Pop/R&B Artist of the Year, Songwriter of the Year, and Album of the Year in 2008. His debut single was called "Oh Yeah", produced by the Stereotypes, and reached #2 on the Bubbling Under R&B/Hip-Hop Singles. It was written by Lil Eddie, Tiwa Savage and Kamaria Ousley. The remix version featuring Snoop Dogg reached #77 on the Canadian Hot 100.

Jaicko's forthcoming debut album is titled Can I. Jaicko wrote and produced several songs on the album, and collaborated with the production team Stargate and Jim Jonsin on the project. Jaicko's 2010 single "FFWD" was featured on the compilation NOW 33.

Prior to signing with Capitol Records, Jaicko released a rap solo album independently in Barbados in November 2006, selling 6,000 copies without major distribution.

Discography

Charted singles

Other releases
 2010: "Fast Forward"
 2013: "Perfect Love"
 2014: "More Than Enough" (with Marc Korn)
 2014: "Love Come Down" (with Bodybangers & TomE)
 2014: "Only Gets Better" (with Carlprit)
 2014: "Shine" (with Blade Deep & DJ Fale)

References

External links 
 Main web site
 Official Artist Twitter page

1991 births
Living people
Barbadian male singers
Barbadian pop singers
People from Christ Church, Barbados